Mesalia lactea is a species of sea snail, a marine gastropod mollusk in the family Turritellidae.

Description

Distribution

References

Turritellidae
Gastropods described in 1842